Hurun is a town of Jingxi, Guangxi, China.

See also
List of township-level divisions of Guangxi

References

Towns of Guangxi
Jingxi, Guangxi
Towns and townships in Baise